Nils Kristian Lysø (born 3 September 1905 in Jøssund, died 7 July 1977) was a Norwegian politician for the Labour Party.

He was elected to the Norwegian Parliament from Sør-Trøndelag in 1958, and was re-elected on one occasion. He had previously served as a deputy representative during the terms 1950–1953 and 1954–1957.

He was the Minister of Fisheries from 1955 to 1963 during the third cabinet Gerhardsen. During this period he was replaced in the Norwegian Parliament by Jenny Lund.

On the local level he was a member of Jøssund municipality council from 1936 to 1954, serving as mayor from 1945 to 1953. From 1945 to 1955 he was also a member of Sør-Trøndelag county council. His political career ended with the position of County Governor of Sør-Trøndelag, which he held from 1963 to 1974.

References

1905 births
1977 deaths
Government ministers of Norway
Mayors of places in Sør-Trøndelag
Members of the Storting
Labour Party (Norway) politicians
County governors of Norway
20th-century Norwegian politicians